Bertram Colgrave, D. Litt. (born 1889, Derry, Ireland – died 13 January 1968, Cambridge, England) was a medieval historian, antiquarian and archaeologist, specializing on the lives of the early saints in Anglo-Saxon England.

Life

Colgrave attended King Edward VI Camp Hill School for Boys in Birmingham, prior to undergraduate studies at the University of Birmingham. He went on to study for a second degree in Anglo-Saxon and Middle English at Clare College in the University of Cambridge, teaching briefly at Merchiston Castle School near Edinburgh from 1916 to 1918. In 1920 he was appointed lecturer in English at Durham University, with a promotion to reader in 1930. He was attached to Hatfield College. He served as dean of the Faculty of Arts between 1933 and 1935 and was the first public orator of the university from 1939 to 1942. From 1950 to 1963 he was founding editor-in-chief of Early English Manuscripts in Facsimile. On his retirement from Durham University in 1954, he held visiting professorships at the University of North Carolina, University of Texas, University of Kansas, University of Colorado and Mount Holyoke College. He fully retired to Coton near Cambridge in 1965. Colgrave was a member of the Plymouth Brethren.

Works
Colgrave specialized on the lives of St Cuthbert and the Venerable Bede. He prepared editions of the Latin lives of the early saints Wilfrid, Cuthbert, Guthlac and Gregory the Great. He was also a historian of the city and diocese of Durham, for which he wrote the official guide. In 1939 in the preface to his edition of Two Lives of Saint Cuthbert, dated "St. Cuthbert's Day" (20 March),  Colgrave wrote, "To edit the two most important Lives of Cuthbert is almost a pious duty for one who lives under the shadow of Durham Cathedral."

Honours
Honorary D.Litt., Durham University, 1957.
Israel Gollancz Memorial Lecture, 1958, British Academy
Inaugural Jarrow Lecture, St Paul's Church, Jarrow, 1958.
Fellow of the Mediaeval Academy of America, 1968.

Selected bibliography

Notes

Sources

External links
Early English Manuscripts in Facsimile
The Jarrow Lectures
Durham University manuscript archives, listing Colgrave's collected papers with biographical details
Catalogue of obituaries, Clare College, Cambridge

Alumni of the University of Birmingham
Alumni of Clare College, Cambridge
Fellows of the Society of Antiquaries of London
Academics of Durham University
British medievalists
People educated at King Edward VI Camp Hill School for Boys
1968 deaths
1889 births
Corresponding Fellows of the Medieval Academy of America